Brevundimonas basaltis is a Gram-negative, aerobic, rod-shaped and motile bacterium from the genus of Brevundimonas which has been isolated from black sand from Soesokkak in Korea.

References

Bacteria described in 2010
Caulobacterales